Murphy v. Waterfront Commission of New York Harbor, 378 U.S. 52 (1964), was a United States Supreme Court case concerning the self-incrimination clause in the Fifth Amendment to the United States Constitution. The Court ruled that a state cannot compel a witness to provide testimony that may be incriminating under other State/Federal laws, even if it granted immunity under its own laws. Decided on the same day as Malloy v. Hogan (1964), the Supreme Court reconsidered its previous rulings that the Federal Government could compel witness testimony that could be incriminating under a state's laws, and states could similarly compel testimony that would be incriminating under Federal law.

Background 
The Waterfront Commission of New York Harbor is a bi-state agency tasked to investigate and aid prosecution of criminal activity in the Port of New York and New Jersey. While investigating work stoppage activity suspected to be in violation of the Waterfront Commission Act, it subpoenaed petitioners asking them to testify about the striking activity under investigation. Petitioners were granted immunity from prosecution under New York and New Jersey laws pursuant to New Jersey law, but they refused to testify beyond their names and union membership status, claiming that the immunity did not protect them from federal prosecution. They were held in civil and criminal contempt by the Law Division of the New Jersey Superior Court. The criminal contempt charges were reversed on appeal to the Supreme Court of New Jersey, while the civil contempt charges were remanded for a new trial. Petitioners appealed to the United States Supreme Court, arguing that the contempt charges were in violation of the Fifth Amendment.

See also 

 List of United States Supreme Court cases, volume 378

References

Further reading

External links
 
 

United States Supreme Court cases of the Warren Court
United States Fifth Amendment self-incrimination case law
Incorporation case law
United States Supreme Court cases
United States Supreme Court decisions that overrule a prior Supreme Court decision
1964 in United States case law
Port of New York and New Jersey